Kuse may refer to:

Places 
 Kuse, Okayama, Japan
 Kuse District, Kyoto, Japan
 Kushe Rural Municipality, Nepal

Other uses 
 KUSE-LD, a television station in the United States
 Kuse Station, a train station in Maniwa, Okayama Prefecture, Japan